Center Point is the name of a few places in the United States:

 Center Point, Alabama
 Center Point, Howard County, Arkansas 
 Center Point, Georgia
 Center Point, Indiana
 Center Point, Iowa
 Center Point, Louisiana
 Center Point, Missouri
 Center Point, New Mexico
 Center Point, Pennsylvania
 Center Point, Camp County, Texas
 Center Point, Kerr County, Texas
 Center Point, Tarrant County, Texas
 Center Point, West Virginia

See also 
Centerpoint (disambiguation)
Centre Point, building in London